The 2003–04 Euro Hockey Tour was the eighth season of the Euro Hockey Tour. The season consisted of four tournaments, the Česká Pojišťovna Cup, Karjala Tournament, Baltica Brewery Cup, and the Sweden Hockey Games. The top two teams met in the final, and the third and fourth place teams met for the third place game.

Tournaments

Česká Pojišťovna Cup
Finland won the Česká Pojišťovna Cup.

Karjala Tournament
Finland won the Karjala Tournament.

Baltica Brewery Cup
Finland won the Baltica Brewery Cup.

Sweden Hockey Games
Sweden won the Sweden Hockey Games.

Final standings

Final tournament

3rd place

Final

References
Euro Hockey Tour website

Euro Hockey Tour
2003–04 in European ice hockey
2003–04 in Russian ice hockey
2003–04 in Czech ice hockey
2003–04 in Swedish ice hockey
2003–04 in Finnish ice hockey